Elpidius is a Roman cognomen.

It was the name of several bishops and saints:

Elpidius, bishop of Huesca (c.522-546)  
Elpidius, bishop of Tarazona
Elpidius, bishop of Comana (Cappadocia)
Saint Elpidius, bishop of Lyon
Saint Elpidius the Cappadocian, abbot and patron saint of Sant'Elpidio a Mare
Elpidius (rebel), 8th-century Byzantine governor of Sicily and rebel
another name for St. Expeditus

See also
 Elpidio (disambiguation)
 Sant'Elpidio (disambiguation)